Jari Jones (born 1991) is an American trans Femme activist, performance artist and creative. Jones was a cast member, script consultant, acting coach, and producer of Port Authority.

Career 
Jones was the first black trans woman producer of a film competing at the Cannes Film Festival. In 2020, Jones was one of the nine faces in Calvin Klein's 2020 pride campaign. Apart from acting, Jones advocates for transgender rights and is part of the Black Lives Matter movement. Jones is a promoter of self-love, Blackness, and femininity. Jones has been featured in New York Fashion Week, becoming the first Black transgender woman to display No Sasso on the runway. Jones has modeled for other brands including Dove in their "Goodbye Judgement, Hello Underarms" campaign and Elizabeth Suzann's "Clothing is Political" campaign. She participated in The Real Catwalk in New York City in 2019. Jones is featured on Calvin Klein's YouTube channel to express her support for LGBTQ+ youth. She is a self-proclaimed, "mom to a whole bunch of queer youth."

She has written for Nylon, The New York Times, Allure, and Out magazine focusing on the representation of queer, transgender, and people of color in the media. She was featured in Netflix's Tales of the City series. She is the first black trans producer to have a film in the Cannes Film Festival. The film, Port Authority, also included the first trans woman of color, Leyna Bloom, in a lead role.

Filmography

Film

Television

See also
 LGBT culture in New York City
 List of LGBT people from New York City

References

External links

Date of birth missing (living people)
1991 births
Living people
21st-century American actresses
Activists from New York (state)
Actresses from New York (state)
African-American female models
American film producers
Black Lives Matter people
Female models from New York (state)
Film producers from New York (state)
LGBT African Americans
American LGBT actors
LGBT models
LGBT producers
American LGBT rights activists
Transgender women
Transgender actresses
Transgender female models
Transgender rights activists
Women civil rights activists
21st-century African-American women
21st-century African-American people